Anthony J. Butkovich (April 4, 1921 – April 18, 1945) was an American football fullback from the University of Illinois and spent his last year at Purdue. He was drafted by the Cleveland Rams in the first round of the 1944 NFL Draft. 

Instead of going to the Rams he enlisted in the US Marines and fought in World War II. While serving as a Marine in the 6th Division on Guadalcanal he participated in the Mosquito Bowl. He died at Okinawa.

Purdue career
He led the nation in rushing in 1943; 833 yards, 142 carries (5.9 average), scoring 16 touchdowns (still tied for a Purdue single season record) and led the Boilermakers to a record of 9–0 and a share of the Big Ten Title.  The Boilermakers finished the season as the No. 4 team in the nation.  In conference play alone, he led the conference in rushing (629 yards over 95 carries) and scoring (13 touchdowns, 78 points).

He was selected All-American by the Associated Press (AP), International News Service, The Sporting News, United Press International (UPI) and Stars and Stripes; he was also First Team, All-Conference.

Statistics
Source:

Personal life
He was a native of St. David, Illinois and graduated from Lewistown High School in Lewistown, Illinois.

He was killed in action at Okinawa.

References
Further reading

External links

 Boilers By Numbers: No. 25
   
 

1921 births
1945 deaths
American football fullbacks
Illinois Fighting Illini football players
Purdue Boilermakers football players
United States Marines
United States Marine Corps personnel killed in World War II
People from Fulton County, Illinois
Players of American football from Illinois